Dudley's Chapel is a historic Methodist church located at Sudlersville, Queen Anne's County, Maryland.  It was built in 1783 and is a simple brick structure with a moderately pitched gable roof.  A coat of stucco was added in 1883, covering all of the original brickwork.  The chapel has a prominent place in the early history of the Methodist Church in Maryland.  It is one of the earliest surviving Methodist churches in Maryland, and was the first Methodist church built in Queen Anne's County. Many of the prominent early leaders of the Methodist Church are known to have preached both at Dudley's including Francis Asbury, Thomas Coke, Richard Whatcoat, Jesse Lee, and Freeborn Garrettson.

It was listed on the National Register of Historic Places in 1979.

References

External links
, including photo from 2002, at Maryland Historical Trust

United Methodist churches in Maryland
Churches in Queen Anne's County, Maryland
Churches on the National Register of Historic Places in Maryland
Churches completed in 1783
18th-century Methodist church buildings in the United States
National Register of Historic Places in Queen Anne's County, Maryland